Advance Australia may refer to:

 Advance Australia, a motto on an early version of the nation's coat of arms
 Advance Australia (lobby group), a political lobbying group
 Advance Australia (yacht), a racing yacht
 "Advance Australia Fair", the national anthem of Australia
 Advance Australia Foundation, an organisation which granted awards in the 1980s and 1990s
 Advance Australia Party (historical), a political party founded in 1988
 Advance Australia Party (2010)
 Advance Australia ... Where?, a book by Hugh Mackay